Enneapterygius nanus, the pygmy triplefin or pygmy threefin, is a species of triplefin blenny in the genus Enneapterygius. It was described by Leonard Peter Schultz in 1960. This species is found from Taiwan and central Indonesia to New Caledonia and the Marshall Islands.

References

nanus
Fish described in 1960